The Fayetteville Patriots were an NBA Development League team based in Fayetteville, North Carolina, United States. Its logo design features a bald eagle's head and a basketball in the middle of a capital letter "P" with stars and stripes filling the rest of it.

Franchise history 
In 2001, the Fayetteville Patriots became one of the National Basketball Development League's eight charter franchises. They played their home games at the Cumberland County Crown Coliseum in Fayetteville, North Carolina. The league would later re-brand as the NBA Development League (or D-League) in 2005.

The Fayetteville Patriots finished last in the D-League in 2005–06 season with a 16–32 record. They got a lift in late February and early March, with the acquisition of Amir Johnson and Alex Acker from the Detroit Pistons. On May 2, 2006, The D-League decided to no longer field a team in Fayetteville. The announcement came a day after the league decided the same fate for the Roanoke Dazzle franchise, based in Roanoke, Virginia.

Season-by-season

Notable players
Chris Andersen, 1st ever draft pick of the NBDL, 1st ever call-up to the NBA from the NBDL with the Denver Nuggets in 2001, 2013 NBA Finals champion with the Miami Heat; former New Orleans Hornet, Memphis Grizzly and Cleveland Cavalier
Gerald Green, 2007 NBA Slam Dunk Contest Champion, former Minnesota Timberwolf, Dallas Maverick, New Jersey Net, Indiana Pacer, Phoenix Sun, Boston Celtic, Miami Heat, and Houston Rocket
Mateen Cleaves, 2000 NCAA National Champion & Most Outstanding Player of the Final Four, former Detroit Piston, Sacramento King, Cleveland Cavalier, and Seattle SuperSonic
Amir Johnson, former Detroit Piston, Toronto Raptor, and Boston Celtic
Alex Acker, former Detroit Piston and Los Angeles Clipper
Terrell McIntyre, former Italian Club "Mens Sana Basket" player
Matt Barnes, former Orlando Magic, Los Angeles Clipper, Sacramento King, New York Knick, Philadelphia 76er, Golden State Warrior, Phoenix Sun, Los Angeles Laker and Sacramento King; won an NBA championship with the Golden State Warriors in 2017.
Devin Brown, former San Antonio Spur, Denver Nugget, Utah Jazz, New Orleans Hornet, Cleveland Cavalier and Chicago Bull; won an NBA championship as a member of the Spurs in 2005

NBA affiliates
Charlotte Bobcats (2005–2006)
Detroit Pistons (2005–2006)
New York Knicks (2005–2006)

References

 
Basketball teams established in 2001
Basketball teams disestablished in 2006
2001 establishments in North Carolina
2006 disestablishments in North Carolina
Basketball teams in North Carolina